Jaan Leeto (1879 – August 1922 Tallinn) was an Estonian politician. He was a member of I Riigikogu from 15 November 1921, when he replaced Villem Tiideman. On 14 March 1922, he resigned his position and he was replaced by Arnold Sommerling.

References

1879 births
1922 deaths
Central Committee of Tallinn Trade Unions politicians
Members of the Riigikogu, 1920–1923